Baracidris is a genus of ants in the subfamily Myrmicinae. The genus is known from central and western Africa.

Species
 Baracidris meketra Bolton, 1981
 Baracidris pilosa Fernández, 2003
 Baracidris sitra Bolton, 1981

References

External links

Myrmicinae
Ant genera
Hymenoptera of Africa